North Korea competed as the Democratic People's Republic of Korea at the 1972 Winter Olympics in Sapporo, Japan.

Speed skating

Women

References
Official Olympic Reports
 Olympic Winter Games 1972, full results by sports-reference.com

Korea, North
1972
1972 in North Korean sport